Mike Simon (April 13, 1883 – June 10, 1963) was a catcher in Major League Baseball between 1909 and 1915.

Sources

Brooklyn Tip-Tops players
Pittsburgh Pirates players
St. Louis Terriers players
Major League Baseball catchers
Indiana Hoosiers baseball players
Baseball players from Indiana
1883 births
1963 deaths
Minor league baseball managers
Columbus Senators players
Peoria Distillers players
Cedar Rapids Rabbits players
Bloomington Bloomers players
Vernon Tigers players
People from Hayden, Indiana